Alloclita plumbaria is a moth in the family Cosmopterigidae. It was described by Edward Meyrick in 1921. It is found in Zimbabwe.

References

Endemic fauna of Zimbabwe
Moths described in 1921
Antequerinae
Moths of Africa